The 2015–16 Campionato Sammarinese di Calcio season was the thirty-first since its establishment. It is the highest level in San Marino, in which the country's top 15 amateur football clubs play. The season began on 11 September 2015 and ended with the play-off final on 26 May 2016. Folgore/Falciano were the defending champions.

Participating teams
Because there is no promotion or relegation in the league, the same 15 teams who competed in the league last season competed in the league this season.
 S.P. Cailungo (Borgo Maggiore)
 S.S. Cosmos (Serravalle)
 F.C. Domagnano (Domagnano)
 S.C. Faetano (Faetano)
 F.C. Fiorentino (Fiorentino)
 S.S. Folgore/Falciano (Serravalle)
 A.C. Juvenes/Dogana (Serravalle)
 S.P. La Fiorita (Montegiardino)
 A.C. Libertas (Borgo Maggiore)
 S.S. Murata (San Marino)
 S.S. Pennarossa (Chiesanuova)
 S.S. San Giovanni (Borgo Maggiore)
 S.P. Tre Fiori (Fiorentino)
 S.P. Tre Penne (Serravalle)
 S.S. Virtus (Acquaviva)

Regular season
The 15 clubs were split into two groups; one with eight clubs and another with seven clubs.

Group A

Group B

Results
All teams played twice against the teams within their own group and once against the teams from the other group. This meant that the clubs in the eight-club group played 21 matches each while the clubs in the seven-club group played 20 matches each during the regular season.

Play-offs
The top three teams from each group advanced to a play-off which determined the season's champion and qualifiers for the 2016–17 UEFA Champions League and the 2016–17 UEFA Europa League.

The play-offs were played in a double-eliminination format with both group winners earning byes in the first and second round. All matches were decided over one leg with extra time and then penalties used to break ties.

The schedule was announced on 21 April 2016.

Bracket

Round 1
Upper

Lower

Pennarossa eliminated.

Round 2
Upper

Lower

Tre Fiori eliminated.

Round 3
Upper final

Lower

Juvenes/Dogana eliminated.

Lower final

Folgore eliminated and qualified for 2016–17 Europa League first qualifying round†.

Final

Tre Penne qualified for 2016–17 Champions League first qualifying round and La Fiorita qualified for 2016–17 Europa League first qualifying round†.†Since La Fiorita had already qualified for the Europa League first qualifying round by winning the 2015–16 Coppa Titano, their European berth (Europa League first qualifying round) for being league runners-up passed to the next highest placed team not already qualified.

References

External links
 
soccerway.com

Campionato Sammarinese di Calcio
San Marino
1